In World War II, French West Africa (Afrique occidentale française, AOF) was not a major scene of major fighting. Only one large-scale action took place there: the Battle of Dakar (23–25 September 1940). The region remained under the control of Vichy France after the fall of France (25 June 1940) and until the Allied invasion of North Africa (8–16 November 1942). French Gabon, the only colony of French Equatorial Africa not to join Free France after the armistice, fell to invading Free French Forces from the neighbouring colonies after the Battle of Gabon (8–12 November 1940), further isolating West Africa.

Unlike in metropolitan France, the French Colonial Troops in West Africa were not reduced after the 1940 armistice and the region was little interfered with by the Axis powers, providing a valuable addition to the forces of Free France after it had been liberated. Before this happened, there was some tension between the French and the neighbouring British colonies, particularly Sierra Leone, leading to the formation of the Freetown Defence Flight in June 1941, but no military incidents took place.

Battle of Dakar 

Anti-British sentiment in Africa had run high after the French battleship Richelieu had been hit in the port of Dakar, Senegal, in French West Africa on 10 July 1940.  In August, Free French General Charles de Gaulle suggested an overland campaign, landing at Conakry, French Guinea. He anticipated that popular support for the Free French movement would be built in a drive on Dakar.  But de Gaulle's suggestion was overruled by British desires to move swiftly.

On 18 September, three French light cruisers, the Georges Leygues, the Gloire, and the Montcalm were intercepted by Allied ships en route to Libreville.  The intercepting Allied ships included the heavy cruiser HMAS Australia.  The three French light cruisers were forced to retreat.

Vichy resistance stiffened as a result of the attacks on the French ships.  The Battle of Dakar (23 September to 25 September 1940) took place after Allied forces failed to persuade the Vichy French defenders of Dakar to allow them to peacefully enter the city.  The Allied forces first tried to persuade the Vichy forces by means of propaganda.  They then attempted to take Dakar by force of arms.  Both attempts ended in defeat. Allied hopes of taking over French West Africa were dashed for the time being, leading to the less developed and economically important French Equatorial Africa to be the main Free French territory in the immediate aftermath of the Armistice.

Battle of Gabon 

The Battle of Gabon (French: Bataille du Gabon), also called the Gabon Campaign (Campagne du Gabon), occurred in November 1940 during World War II. The battle resulted in forces under the orders of General Charles de Gaulle taking the colony of Gabon and its capital, Libreville, from Vichy France, and the rallying of French Equatorial Africa to Free France. It was the first military engagement leading to the liberation of France, and the only battle of the war fought in Equatorial Africa – West Africa.

See also 
 Liberation of France
 Thiaroye massacre

References

Further reading

External links 

 LemaireSoft's Dakar: operation Menace. September 23, 1940
 Ahoy – Mac's Web Log – "Operation Menace." September 23, 24, 25, 1940. HMAS Australia and the debacle at Dakar with General Charles de Gaulle
 Evelyn Waugh – Page 2
 HMAS Australia (II)

1940s in French West Africa
African theatres of World War II
Campaigns of World War II
France in World War II
Vichy France
French Sudan
French West Africa
History of West Africa
20th century in Mali
1940s in Mauritania
1940s in French Dahomey
1940s in Gabon
1940s in Senegal
20th century in French Upper Volta
1940s in Ivory Coast
1940s in Guinea
20th century in Togo
1940s in Niger